Wolfgang is a German male given name traditionally popular in Germany, Austria and Switzerland. The name is a combination of the Old High German words wolf, meaning "wolf", and gang, meaning "path", "journey", "travel". Besides the regular "wolf", the first element also occurs in Old High German as the combining form "-olf".
The earliest reference of the name being used was in the 8th century. The name was also attested as "Vulfgang" in the Reichenauer Verbrüderungsbuch in the 9th century. The earliest recorded famous bearer of the name was a tenth-century  Saint Wolfgang of Regensburg. Due to the lack of conflict with the pagan reference in the name with Catholicism, it is likely a much more ancient name whose meaning had already been lost by the tenth century. Grimm (Teutonic Mythology p. 1093) interpreted the name as that of a hero in front of whom walks the "wolf of victory". A Latin gloss by Arnold of St Emmeram interprets the name as Lupambulus.

Royalty and nobility
Wolfgang of Regensburg (934–994), Bavarian bishop and Catholic saint
Wolfgang, Prince of Anhalt-Köthen (1492–1566), German prince of the House of Ascania
Wolfgang of the Palatinate (1494–1558), German nobleman from the House of Wittelsbach
Wolfgang, Count Palatine of Zweibrücken (1526–1569), Duke of Zweibrücken
Wolfgang, Duke of Brunswick-Grubenhagen (1531–1595), Prince of Grubenhagen from 1567–1595
Wolfgang, Count of Hohenlohe-Weikersheim (1546–1610)
Wolfgang Wilhelm, Count Palatine of Neuburg (1578–1653), Duke of Neuburg, Jülich and Berg
Prince Wolfgang of Hesse (1896–1989), designated Hereditary Prince of the monarchy of Finland
Wolfgang von Trips (1928–1961), son of a noble Rhineland family

Given name
Wolfgang Albers (disambiguation), several people
Wolfgang Ambros (born 1952), Austrian singer-songwriter
Wolfgang Baldus, German philatelist and writer
Wolfgang Barthels (born 1940), German footballer
Wolfgang Bauer (disambiguation), several people
Wolfgang Bernhard (born 1960), former President of Chrysler
Wolfgang Blochwitz (1941–2005), East German footballer
Wolfgang Bodison (born 1966), American actor
Wolfgang Boettcher (1935–2021), German classical cellist
Wolfgang Bolyai (1775–1856), Hungarian mathematician
Wolfgang Borchert (1921–1947), German author and playwright
Wolfgang Bosbach (born 1952), German politician 
Wolfgang Bosch, mayor of Ljubljana 1520–1524
Wolfgang Brinkmann (born 1950), German equestrian
Wolfgang Clement (1940–2020), German politician 
Wolfgang Danne (born 1941), West German pair skater
Wolfgang Dauner (1935–2020), German jazz fusion pianist, composer and keyboardist
Wolfgang Dietrich (disambiguation), several people
Wolfgang Dremmler (born 1954), German footballer 
Wolfgang Flür (born 1947), German musician, Kraftwerk
Wolfgang Franz (mathematician) (1905–1996), German mathematician
Wolfgang Gaede (1878–1945), German physicist and pioneer of vacuum engineering
Wolfgang Gartner (born 1982), stage name of the American electro house DJ Joseph Youngman
Wolfgang Herold (born 1961), producer
Wolfgang Jerat (1955–2020), German footballer
Wolfgang Joop (born 1944), German fashion designer 
Wolfgang Kapp (1858–1922), Prussian civil servant and right-wing nationalist
Wolfgang Kautek, Austrian physical chemist 
Wolfgang Ketterle (born 1957), German physicist
Wolfgang Kleff (born 1946), German footballer 
Wolfgang Kuck (born 1967), German volleyball player
Wolfgang Langewiesche (1907–2002), German aviation expert and author
Wolfgang Leonhard (1921–2014), German professor and expert on communism
Wolfgang Lück (born 1957), German mathematician
Wolfgang Michel-Zaitsu (born 1946), German Japanologist
Wolfgang Amadeus Mozart (1756–1791), Austro-German composer
Wolfgang Niersbach (born 1950), president of the German Football Association
Wolfgang Overath (born 1943), German footballer
Wolfgang Pagenstecher (1880–1953), German heraldist
Wolfgang Pauli (1900–1958), Austrian-born Swiss American physicist, Nobel Prize
Wolfgang Petersen (1941–2022), German film director
Wolfgang Petry (born 1951), German singer and songwriter 
Wolfgang Preiss (1910–2002), German actor
Wolfgang Priklopil (1962–2006), Austrian criminal, captor of Natascha Kampusch
Wolfgang Puck (born 1949), American chef
Wolfgang Reinhardt (producer) (1908–1979), German film producer and screenwriter
Wolfgang Reinhardt (athlete) (1943–2011), West German pole vaulter
Wolfgang Reitherman (1909–1985), German-American Disney animator
Wolfgang Rihm (born 1952), German composer
Wolfgang W.E. Samuel (born 1935), German-born American author and a veteran of the United States Air Force
Wolfgang Schäuble (born 1942), German politician (CDU)
Wolfgang Schmidt (born 1954), German discus thrower
Wolfgang Schneiderhan (violinist) (1915–2002), Austrian violinist
Wolfgang Schneiderhan (general) (born 1946), German general
Wolfgang Stumph (born 1946), German actor 
Wolfgang Thierse (born 1943), German politician 
Wolfgang Tillmans (born 1968), German fine-art photographer and artist
Wolfgang Uhlmann, chess player
Wolfgang Van Halen (born 1991), American musician, Van Halen
Wolfgang von Kempelen (1734–1804), Hungarian author and inventor
Wolfgang von Leyden (1911–2004), German philosopher
Wolfgang von Schweinitz (born 1953), German composer and teacher
Wolfgang von Trips (1928–1961), German racing driver
Wolfgang Wagner (1919–2010), German opera director
Wolfgang Werlé, German murderer
Wolfgang Weyrauch (1904–1980), German writer and playwright

Middle name
Erich Wolfgang Korngold (1897–1957)
Doyle Wolfgang von Frankenstein (born 1964), formerly of the band Misfits
Johann Wolfgang von Goethe (1749–1832)

Art, entertainment, and media
Wolfgang (film), a short film directed by Anders Thomas Jensen
Wolfgang Amadeus Phoenix, fourth studio album by French indie pop band Phoenix
Wolfgang, a character appearing in the American comedy television series The Thundermans
Wolfgang Bogdanow, a character appearing in the American science fiction drama web television series Sense8
Wolfgang Krauser von Stroheim, a character from the Fatal Fury series introduced as the final boss of Fatal Fury 2

References

English masculine given names